Dennis Pavao (July 11, 1951 - January 19, 2002), was one of several Hawaiian musicians who, during the 1970s, led a Hawaiian music renaissance, reviving Hawaiian music, especially "ka leo ki'eki'e," or Hawaiian falsetto singing.  Along with his cousins, Ledward and Nedward Kaapana, Pavao started the group Hui Ohana.  Hui Ohana became the premier falsetto group in Hawaii.  After the breakup of Hui Ohana, Dennis Pavao moved on to pursue a solo career.

Pavao was born in Kalapana on the Big Island in Hawaii. Jerry Kunimoto, one of Dennis' close longtime friends once said, "Dennis’ recordings over three decades will be sung for generations; he’s one of those performers. If our lives can be measured by the number of people we can touch in a positive way, then Dennis is in a place we all aspire to." He died from a brain aneurysm on January 19, 2002, at the age of fifty.

Nā Hōkū Hanohano
Dennis won several different Nā Hōkū Hanohano, meaning the distinguished/glorious stars, awards.
His 1989 album, Hawaiian Soul, won the Nā Hōkū Hanohano award for traditional Hawaiian album of the year.
In 1987, his album Ka Leo Kiekie, meaning falsetto voice, won him the top male vocalist of the year award.
In 1993, he received a Nā Hōkū Hanohano award for his album Nā Mele Henoheno.

Albums
Ka Leo Kiekie - 1986
Hawaiian Soul - 1989
Na Mele Henoheno - 1992
All Hawaii Stand Together - 1994
Wale Nō - 1995
Sweet Leilani - 1996
Keiki Kupuna - 2004 (The songs on this album were recorded just weeks prior to his death.)
Golden Voice of Hawaii, Vol 1 - 2004 (Includes never released Dennis Pavao recordings as well as some re-mixed and re-mastered recordings that his producer, Trav Duro, Jr. put together after his death.)

References

1951 births
2002 deaths
Native Hawaiian musicians
Mountain Apple Company artists
Na Hoku Hanohano Award winners
20th-century American musicians
Deaths from intracranial aneurysm